Belev dol  is a village in Smolyan Municipality, located in the Smolyan Province of southern Bulgaria. The village covers an area of 3.764 km2 and is located 178.3 km from Sofia. As of 2007, the village had a population of 87 people.

References

Villages in Smolyan Province